Continental Express Flight 2574 (Jetlink 2574) was a scheduled domestic passenger airline flight operated by Britt Airways from Laredo International Airport in Laredo, Texas to Houston Intercontinental Airport (IAH) (now called George Bush Intercontinental Airport) in Houston, Texas. On September 11, 1991, the Embraer EMB 120 Brasilia turboprop, registered N33701, crashed while initiating its landing sequence, killing all 14 people on board.

The media stated that there was initial speculation that a bomb had destroyed the aircraft; however, the National Transportation Safety Board (NTSB) subsequently discovered that missing screws on the horizontal stabilizer led to the crash.

Aircraft and crew

The Embraer 120 Brasilia, serial number 120077, was built in 1988, three years before the accident, and had accumulated 7,229 flight hours through 10,009 cycles. The Federal Aviation Administration records stated that the aircraft had been sent to the maintenance hangar 33 times for unscheduled repairs.

The crew consisted of 29-year-old captain Brad Patridge of Kingwood, Texas (Greater Houston), 43-year-old first officer Clint Rodosovich of Houston and 33-year-old flight attendant Nancy Reed of Humble, Texas. Patridge and Rodosovich were experienced pilots with 4,243 flight hours and 11,543 flight hours (including 2,468 hours and 1,066 hours on the EMB 120 Brasilia), respectively.

Incident
The EMB 120 departed Laredo International Airport at 09:09, operating under Federal Aviation Regulation Part 135. After a normal takeoff, the flight was assigned a cruise altitude of flight level 250
(), then reassigned to FL240. The escaping fuel from the wings ignited, and the pilots lost consciousness from the severe g-forces, which reached at least 3.375 times the force of gravity, caused by the severe oscillations of the crippled aircraft. The Texas Department of Public Safety announced that rescue units had discovered no survivors. The wreckage was spread over a 2- to  area, and some pieces fell into the Colorado River. Diamonds worth approximately $500,000 (1991 value; $ in ) were discovered in the wreckage, but they had no role in the crash.

Investigation
The National Transportation Safety Board (NTSB) investigation revealed that screws had been removed from the horizontal stabilizer during maintenance the night before the accident and, following a shift change, the screws had not been replaced.

The NTSB cited the failure of airline maintenance and inspection personnel to adhere to proper maintenance and quality-assurance procedures. The failure of Federal Aviation Administration (FAA) surveillance to detect and verify compliance with approved procedures was cited as a contributing factor. Following the accident, the FAA conducted a National Aviation Safety Inspection Program (NASIP) of Continental Express'
maintenance program. It found very few safety deficiencies, and
complimented the airline on its internal evaluation system. The NTSB expressed concern that the NASIP did not find deficiencies in shift-turnover procedures and other matters relevant to the accident, and recommended that the agency improve its NASIP procedures.

Probable cause
The NTSB determined the probable causes of the accident as follows:

"The failure of Continental Express maintenance and inspection personnel to adhere to proper maintenance and quality assurance procedures for the airplane's horizontal stabilizer de-ice boots that led to the sudden in-flight loss of the partially secured left horizontal stabilizer leading edge and the immediate severe nose-down pitchover and breakup of the airplane. Contributing to the cause of the accident was the failure of the Continental Express management to ensure compliance with the approved maintenance procedures, and the failure of FAA surveillance to detect and verify compliance with approved procedures."

Role in developing the culture of safety
Some experts say that the crash of Continental Express Flight 2574 was the most dramatic turning point for "safety culture" in the United States. NTSB member Dr. John Lauber suggested that the probable cause of the accident included "The failure of Continental Express management to establish a corporate culture which encouraged and enforced adherence to approved maintenance and quality assurance procedures." As a result of this and other similar aviation accidents, safety culture became the main topic at the U.S. National Summit on Transportation Safety, hosted by the NTSB in 1997.

This movement for air safety continued with the April 5, 2000 enactment of the Wendell H. Ford Aviation Investment and Reform Act for the 21st Century, also called AIR 21.

Dramatization 
The Discovery Channel Canada / National Geographic TV series Mayday featured the accident in a Season 11 episode titled "Breakup Over Texas."

Smithsonian Channel also featured this episode in its series Air Disasters (2013, Season 3, Episode 6.)

See also 
 List of accidents and incidents involving commercial aircraft

Similar accidents
China Airlines Flight 611, a flight that suffered a catastrophic mid-air breakup after improper repairs from a tail strike 22 years prior.
Japan Air Lines Flight 123, a flight accident caused by a faulty tailstrike repair 7 years prior.
Chalk's Ocean Airways Flight 101, a case where a wing separated from a flight after improper corrosion repairs to the aircraft. 
Aloha Airlines Flight 243, an aircraft that suffered an explosive decompression after improper corrosion repairs.
Far Eastern Air Transport Flight 103, a flight that disintegrated in midair after improper corrosion repairs.

References

External links
NTSB abstract
NTSB letter
Aircraft One data
Horswell, Cindy, T. J. Milling, Rad Sallee. "Crash in Colorado County/Attendant on doomed aircraft had resigned to take a new job." Houston Chronicle. Saturday September 14, 1991. A27. Available from the Houston Public Library newspapers section , accessible with a library card and PIN

1991 in Texas
Airliner accidents and incidents in Texas
Airliner accidents and incidents caused by maintenance errors
Colorado County, Texas
2574
Accidents and incidents involving the Embraer EMB 120 Brasilia
Aviation accidents and incidents in the United States in 1991
September 1991 events in the United States